(born April 8, 1976) is a Japanese professional wrestler currently competing in Big Japan Pro Wrestling in the Deathmatch division. He is well known for his death match style of wrestling.

Career

Big Japan Pro Wrestling (1999–present) 
Ito, whose gimmick is reminiscent of the Mortal Kombat icon Liu Kang, has been known for competing in many deathmatches over the span of his career, including a Cage match variation which saw him defeat Kintaro Kanemura. Ito is perhaps most famous for participating in an infamous "Lightube Lightsaber match" in which he fought and defeated Abdullah Kobayashi. The match has since become a hit video among hardcore wrestling fans on the website YouTube.

In 2008, Ito competed at IWA East Coast's Masters of Pain, where he lost to Thumbtack Jack in the finals after defeating Drake Younger and Danny Havoc. He also wrestled in Chikara at The Global Gauntlet the same year.

In addition to his gruesome matches, Ito has accumulated several championships over his career while working for both Big Japan Pro Wrestling and Dramatic Dream Team and has also feuded with both Shadow WX and Men's Teioh over his titles, making him a main eventer within both promotions.

Other media
Ito appears as himself in the video game Backyard Wrestling 2: There Goes the Neighborhood, and also appears as himself alongside Daisuke Sekimoto, Abdullah Kobayashi, Takashi Sasaki and Jaki Numazawa in the 2006 movie Dirty Sanchez: The Movie. Ito and the other wrestlers perform wrestling moves on the three main cast members.

Championships and accomplishments
Big Japan Pro Wrestling
BJW Deathmatch Heavyweight Championship (7 times)
BJW Tag Team Championship (2 times) – with Badboy Hido (1) and Abdullah Kobayashi (1)
WEW Hardcore Tag Team Championship (1 time) – with Daisaku Shimoda
Yokohama Shopping Street 6-Man Tag Team Championship (5 times) – with Kankuro Hoshino and Shinya Ishikawa (1), Daisuke Sekimoto and Jaki Numazawa (1), Abdullah Kobayashi and Jaki Numazawa (1), Jake Numazawa and Yuko Miyamoto (1), and Takashi Sasaki and Yuko Miyamoto (1)
Hayabusa Cup (2002)
Ikkitousen Deathmatch Survivor (2013)
Combat Zone Wrestling
Triangle of Ultraviolence (2011)
Dramatic Dream Team
KO-D Tag Team Championship (1 time) – with Sanshiro Takagi
Japan Indie Awards
Best Bout Award (2009) vs. Jun Kasai on November 20
Best Bout Award (2016) vs. Kankuro Hoshino on July 24
Tokyo Sports
Match of the Year Award (2009) vs. Jun Kasai on November 20
Westside Xtreme Wrestling
Messengers Of Death (2011)

References

External links

Big Japan Wrestling Fans: Ryuji Ito
Ryuji Ito at purolove.com

Ryuji Ito at wrestlingzone.ru

1976 births
Japanese male professional wrestlers
Living people
20th-century professional wrestlers
21st-century professional wrestlers
WEW Hardcore Tag Team Champions
BJW Deathmatch Heavyweight Champions
BJW Tag Team Champions
Yokohama Shopping Street 6-Man Tag Team Champions